The Illinois coal wars, also known as the Illinois mine wars and several other names, were a series of labor disputes between 1898 and 1900 in central and southern Illinois.

The disputes were marked by the Chicago–Virden Coal Company bringing in strikebreakers by train to bypass local coal miners, racial violence between black and white coal miners, most notably during the Battle of Virden on October 12, 1898, and the Pana massacre on April 10, 1899. 

In 1898, a coal miners' strike began in Virden after the Chicago-Virden Coal Company refused to pay their miners union-scale wages. The strike ended with six security guards and seven miners killed, and over 30 others were injured. The company finally granted the wage increase a month after the strike. The strike in Virden is also credited with the winning of the 8-hour work day for hourly mine workers, and a memorial in the town square commemorates the battle.

The same conditions and organizations were also involved in similar conflicts in two southern Illinois towns: in Lauder (now Cambria, Illinois) on June 30, 1899, and in Carterville, Illinois on September 17. At Lauder a group of African-American miners traveling by train from Pana were attacked.  One woman, Anna Karr, was killed and about twenty others wounded. At Carterville, five more non-union African-American miners were killed in rioting.  Local juries acquitted all defendants accused in those attacks.

After the massacre, the mine operators temporarily shut down all of Pana's mines in late June to demonstrate good faith in arbitration, and also because of their fear of violence. Because of the low wages paid by the operators, the black community was left impoverished. Many of them spent their money to get to Weir, Kansas, where many of them were recruited to break up another mining strike.

Context 
 
Just southwest of Springfield, Illinois, in 1852 a newly established town called Virden quickly rose from the ground up with various businesses, churches, a doctor and the towns' first school. The completion of the Chicago and Alton Railroad helped prompt the establishment of Virden. Later during the spring of 1853 they also had dry goods as well, for stores, which brought in people. 

January 1855, areas around Virden and Virden itself went through one of the most disastrous snowstorms that they had seen. Train-cars were stuck on the railroads, and passenger cars couldn't be unloaded. Following the devastating storm, although causing some setback for the town, in 1869 the first coal shaft was sunk down, and over the next few decades Virden grew to supporting 21 different coal mines. With so many mines being held up by such a small, fairly new town, mine workers got over worked and underpaid. This resulted in the United Mine Workers national coal strike in 1897, where an agreement was made in January 1898 by all Illinois coal companies and the districts of UMW that there was going to be a new 40-cent per ton rate. Quite quickly after though, the Chicago-Virden Coal Company repealed the agreement and went down to the South, mainly Birmingham, Alabama to bring back African American strikebreakers to work in the mines, lowering the hours for the people that were striking.

The Riot 
 
As the Chicago-Virden Coal Company repeals the agreement the European immigrants in the labor unions that were striking feel threatened by the African American miners coming in. Near the end of September 1868 as one train car came in to Virden full of workers, a stockade was built by the entrance of the mine and around 300 armed workers came from around the area to meet the train as it was about to stop full of the strikebreakers, but it speeds past and continues onto Springfield, IL. Close to three weeks after the first load of workers attempted to land but couldn't, the numbers of strikers went up to almost 2,000, the company owner decided he would try again and bring in another train but as he brought in that load of workers the white workers shot at the train, resulting in it stopping at the stockade. A pitch battle then broke out between the white union workers, guards, and a few black Birmingham workers. The fight lasted around ten minutes including 7 striking miners and 5 guards killed in the riot, along with 30 other individuals injured, one of which was a Birmingham worker. October 13, the day after the union said that they wouldn't take care of the African American workers and so a pair of people ran away being stopped by white workers and beaten. A mob gathered at the Mayor's office and was threatening to begin lynching all the strikebreakers. Instead Mayor Loren Wheeler sent all of the Birmingham workers on a train to St. Louis. 

State troops were called into the town and into the surrounding areas. Investigation and charges were filed against some mine strikers and owners, but no convictions were brought up. The coal company also accepted the requests of the workers and re-opened the mines as quickly as they could.

See also
Murder of workers in labor disputes in the United States
Herrin Massacre
Coal Wars
Mining in the United States
Copper Country strike of 1913–1914
Cripple Creek miners' strike of 1894
West Virginia coal wars
Colorado Labor Wars
Harlan County War
Molly Maguires
Battle of Blair Mountain
Coal strike of 1902

References

External links
 McLean County Coal Company Collection, McLean County Museum of History

1898 labor disputes and strikes
1899 labor disputes and strikes
1900 labor disputes and strikes
Conflicts in 1898
Conflicts in 1899
Conflicts in 1900
Riots and civil disorder in Illinois
Coal Wars
1899 in Illinois
1900 in Illinois
Labor disputes in Illinois